Morgan Cox (born April 26, 1986) is an American football long snapper for the Tennessee Titans of the National Football League (NFL). He was signed by the Baltimore Ravens as an undrafted free agent in 2010. He played college football at Tennessee.

College career
Cox was a walk-on for the Tennessee Volunteers football team as a long snapper, earning a scholarship prior to the 2008 season. Cox was the starting long snapper for Tennessee for the 2007, 2008, and 2009 seasons. He earned Academic All-SEC honors from 2006–2009.

Cox was invited to participate in the 2010 Senior Bowl that took place on January 30, 2010.

Professional career

Baltimore Ravens

Cox was signed by the Baltimore Ravens as an undrafted free agent following the 2010 NFL Draft on May 6, 2010. He earned the starting long snapper job after the Ravens released Matt Katula on August 14, 2010. Cox was part of the 2012 Baltimore Ravens Super Bowl XLVII victory over the San Francisco 49ers on February 3, 2013. In the season opener of the 2013 season against the Denver Broncos, Cox recovered a punt that was muffed by Wes Welker. On October 19, 2014, Cox tore his ACL against the Atlanta Falcons and was placed on season ending injured reserve the day after. He was replaced by Kevin McDermott for the remainder of the season. Cox recovered from the injury, and resumed his long snapping duties for the 2015 season. Cox, along with punter Sam Koch, was named to his first Pro Bowl in 2016.

On March 7, 2016, Cox signed a five-year contract extension with the Ravens.

In 2020, Cox was one of 18 players placed on the reserve/COVID-19 list before the Ravens' Week 12 game against the Pittsburgh Steelers. He was placed on the list on November 27, 2020, and activated on December 7. He was replaced by Nick Moore. He became the first long snapper to ever be selected to first-team All-Pro (this was the first year the NFL had long snappers on the ballot). However, on January 25, 2021, the Ravens announced that they would be going with Nick Moore for the next season and would not be re-signing Cox.

Tennessee Titans
On March 18, 2021, Cox signed a one-year contract with the Tennessee Titans. He re-signed with the team on March 10, 2022.

On March 10, 2023, Cox re-signed on another one-year contract.

References

External links
Baltimore Ravens bio
Tennessee Volunteers football bio

1986 births
Living people
Players of American football from Tennessee
People from Collierville, Tennessee
American football long snappers
Tennessee Volunteers football players
Baltimore Ravens players
Tennessee Titans players
Unconferenced Pro Bowl players
American Conference Pro Bowl players
Ed Block Courage Award recipients